Robin Nicholson may refer to:

Robin Nicholson (novelist) (born 1930), pseudonym of the British writer Christopher Nicole
Sir Robin Nicholson (metallurgist) (born 1934), British metallurgist